Tamanos Mountain is a  summit located in Mount Rainier National Park in Pierce County of Washington state. It is part of the Cascade Range. Tamanos Mountain is situated west of Governors Ridge and northeast of the Cowlitz Chimneys, all of which can be seen from the Sunrise Historic District. The name tamanos derives from Chinook Jargon and has the meaning of guardian spirit. This landform's toponym was officially adopted by the U.S. Board on Geographic Names in 1932. The normal climbing access is from the Owyhigh Lakes Trail, and from the lakes scrambling up the south slope to the summit.

Climate

Tamanos Mountain is located in the marine west coast climate zone of western North America. Most weather fronts originate in the Pacific Ocean, and travel northeast toward the Cascade Mountains. As fronts approach, they are forced upward by the peaks of the Cascade Range (Orographic lift), causing them to drop their moisture in the form of rain or snowfall onto the Cascades. As a result, the west side of the Cascades experiences high precipitation, especially during the winter months in the form of snowfall. Because of maritime influence, snow tends to be wet and heavy, resulting in high avalanche danger. During winter months, the weather is usually cloudy, but due to high pressure systems over the Pacific Ocean that intensify during summer months, there is often little or no cloud cover during the summer. Precipitation runoff from Tamanos Mountain drains into the White River.

See also

 Geography of Washington (state)
 Geology of the Pacific Northwest
List of mountain peaks of Washington (state)

References

External links
 Weather forecast: Tamanos Mountain
 National Park Service web site: Mount Rainier National Park

Cascade Range
Mountains of Pierce County, Washington
Mountains of Washington (state)
Mount Rainier National Park
Chinook Jargon place names
North American 2000 m summits